Cerová vrchovina Protected Landscape Area is one of the 14 protected landscape areas in Slovakia. The Landscape Area is situated in the Cerová vrchovina Mountains, part of the Western Carpathians, in southern Slovakia. It is situated in the Rimavská Sobota, Poltár and Lučenec districts and ends at the Slovak-Hungary borders in the east. The area protects 167.71 km2 of the mountains, and it excludes all urban areas, except for the villages of Hajnáčka and Šiatorská Bukovinka.

History
The Protected Landscape Area was established on 10 October 1989. The law was amended on 3 September 2001. There were national nature reserves in the area before the Protected Landscape Area was created, for example Šomoška (declared in 1954) and Ragáč (1964).

Geography

References

External links
Cerová vrchovina PLA at Slovakia.travel

Protected areas of Slovakia
Protected areas established in 1989
Protected areas of the Western Carpathians
Geography of Banská Bystrica Region
Tourist attractions in Banská Bystrica Region
1989 establishments in Slovakia